KataWeb S.p.A. is an Italian company who offers internet publishing and related services.

Its services include a web portal and dial-up Internet access that was launched in 1999. Subsequently, it offered access to more disparate materials, organised into channels, and services such as e-mail (called Katamail, sold to Tiscali in 2015), VoIP and blog host.

References

External links
 Kataweb Home page 
 Italian Wikipedia on Kataweb

Internet technology companies of Italy
Internet properties established in 1999
Italian companies established in 1999